Ricardo Álvarez de Mena (born 26 October 1957) is a retired Spanish footballer who played as a midfielder.

Career statistics

Club

Notes

References

1957 births
Living people
Spanish footballers
Association football midfielders
Real Madrid CF players
Real Madrid Castilla footballers
Racing de Santander players
Hércules CF players
Segunda División B players
Segunda División players
La Liga players
Palencia CF players